The Itapicuru River is a river in Bahia state of eastern Brazil. The Itapicuru rises in the northern part of the state, and flows east to empty into the Atlantic Ocean.

References

Rivers of Bahia